The Misuse of Drugs Act is a national drug control law of Belize that divides drugs into three classes. There does not seem to be any mechanism for adding, removing, or transferring drugs between classes without amending the statute. Like the Misuse of Drugs Acts of other nations, this statute is designed to implement the provisions of the Single Convention on Narcotic Drugs and its supplementary drug control treaties.

See also
Politics of Belize

References
Misuse of Drugs Act, 1990, United Nations Office on Drugs and Crime.

Drug control law
Law of Belize
Health in Belize
1990 in law
1990 in Belize